Rhaeboceras is an extinct genus of ammonite belonging to the subfamily Scaphitinae. Species belonging to the genus lived during the Cretaceous and have been found in the Pierre Shale of North America.

Taxonomy
The genus Ponteixites is currently deemed a junior synonym of Rhaeboceras, with most specimens formerly assigned to Ponteixites appearing to be juveniles. The finding of a larger fossil specimen assigned to P. robustus similar to these juvenile remains provides evidence supporting this lumping.

References 

Cretaceous ammonites
Scaphitidae